Chudleigh railway station was a railway station in Chudleigh, a small town in Devon, England located between the towns of Newton Abbot and Exeter.

The station opened on 9 October 1882 and was met with high expectations. It had one platform, which served the Teign Valley Line. There was a wooden building situated on the Chudleigh side of the line: the River Teign was on the other side. There was a goods siding next to the station. The station was host to a GWR camp coach in 1939. A camping coach was positioned here by the Western Region from 1956 to 1958.

The station was busy at peak hours, with commuters using it to travel to Exeter. Chudleigh town centre was over a mile away up the hill.

The station closed to passengers on 9 June 1958 when passenger trains were withdrawn from the Teign Valley Line, and goods facilities were withdrawn on 4 December 1967, although for the last two years only coal traffic was handled here. The station was later demolished and the A38 road took its place a few years later.

The Chudleigh Flood Platform was a wooden structure on higher ground on the line towards Trusham that was used when Chudleigh station was flooded, this being a regular seasonal occurrence. 

The only trace of the station is when leaving Chudleigh towards Newton Abbot, the dual carriageway junction is called "Chudleigh Station". The bridge remains in place just after the river bridge.

References
Notes

Sources

Further reading
 Chudleigh now and then (1996)
 The Teign Valley Line (1984)

External links
 Disused Stations http://www.disused-stations.org.uk/c/chudleigh/index.shtml

Disused railway stations in Devon
Former Great Western Railway stations
Railway stations in Great Britain opened in 1882
Railway stations in Great Britain closed in 1958
Chudleigh